Eddyville No. 6 Precinct is located in Pope County, Illinois, USA.  As of the 2000 census, its population was 721.

Geography

References

Precincts in Pope County, Illinois